Dorothy Way Eggan (1901–1965) was an American anthropologist noted for her research among the Hopi tribe.

She was born October 31, 1901, in Dover Hill, Indiana.  During her first marriage, to Jean C. Harrington, she lived in Santa Fe, New Mexico, and became acquainted with the Pueblo peoples.  Her interest in anthropology was confirmed when Harrington entered the University of Chicago as a graduate student in archaeology.  She became a secretary in the Department of Anthropology there and befriended the anthropologists Robert Redfield and A. R. Radcliffe-Brown.

She divorced Harrington and married Fred Eggan, an anthropologist at Chicago, in 1939 and spent the following summer doing fieldwork with the Hopi in Arizona.  Her interests included dreams and psychoanalysis with respect to Hopi culture.  She also became associated with the Institute for Psychoanalysis in Chicago.

She had been suffering from rheumatic fever, however, she continued to write a series of papers regarding the importance of dreams of anthropology and social science. She died in July 1965.

Works
(1943) "The General Problem of Hopi Adjustment." American Anthropologist, pp. 731.
(1949) "The Significance of Dreams for Anthropological Research."  American Anthropologist, vol. 51, pp. 177–198.
(1952) "The Manifest Content of Dreams: A Challenge to Social Science."  American Anthropologist, vol. 54, pp. 469–485.
(1961) "Dream Analysis." In Studying Personality Cross-Culturally, ed. by Bert Kaplan.  Evanston: Illinois: Row, Peterson & Co.
(1966) "Hopi Dreams in Cultural Perspective."  In The Dream and Human Societies, ed. by G. von Grunebaum.  Berkeley: University of California Press.

Bibliography
Singer, Milton (1967) Obituary for Dorothy Way Eggan.  American Anthropologist, vol. 69, no. 6, pp. 731–732.

References

External links
 Guide to the Dorothy Eggan Papers 1925-1989 at the University of Chicago Special Collections Research Center

1901 births
1965 deaths
American women anthropologists
University of Chicago alumni
20th-century American women scientists
20th-century American scientists
20th-century American anthropologists